Paul Andre Larivee (September 7, 1930 – December 8, 2003) was a Canadian professional hockey player who played for the Providence Reds in the American Hockey League.

External links
 

1930 births
2003 deaths
Canadian ice hockey centres
Laval National coaches
Providence Reds players
Canadian ice hockey coaches